Éverton Leandro dos Santos Pinto or simply Éverton Santos (born 14 October 1986 in São José dos Campos, São Paulo state) is a Brazilian footballer who currently plays as a forward.

Career 
He started his career playing in the youth groups of São José EC. On 2 March 2010 Goiás Esporte Clube signed the striker on loan  from Paris Saint-Germain.

On 21 March 2011, Éverton Santos moved to the South Korean K League Classic side Seongnam Ilhwa Chunma on a loan deal, which was made permanent after paying overdue wages for about €75K. On 17 July 2014, Éverton moved to the South Korean K League Classic side FC Seoul. On 28 July 2015, he joined Ulsan Hyundai.

In August 2017, Santos signed for Indian Super League franchise Mumbai City.

In September 2018, Santos moved to fellow Indian club ATK.

Honours 
Seongnam Ilhwa Chunma

2011 FA Cup Winner

Career statistics

K League 
Correct as of 22 December 2015

References

External links
 
 Official Profile at Paris Saint-Germain Website
 
 
 
 

1986 births
Living people
People from São José dos Campos
Brazilian footballers
Association football forwards
São José Esporte Clube players
Esporte Clube Santo André players
Clube Atlético Bragantino players
Sport Club Corinthians Paulista players
Associação Atlética Ponte Preta players
Paris Saint-Germain F.C. players
Fluminense FC players
Albirex Niigata players
Seongnam FC players
Figueirense FC players
FC Seoul players
Ulsan Hyundai FC players
Santa Cruz Futebol Clube players
Campeonato Brasileiro Série A players
Campeonato Brasileiro Série B players
Ligue 1 players
J1 League players
K League 1 players
Brazilian expatriate footballers
Expatriate footballers in France
Expatriate footballers in Japan
Expatriate footballers in South Korea
Brazilian expatriate sportspeople in South Korea
Footballers from São Paulo (state)